Centerton, New Jersey may refer to:
Centerton, Burlington County, New Jersey
Centerton, Salem County, New Jersey